1 Puppis is a single star in the southern constellation of Puppis. It lies in the northern part of the constellation at a distance of about 790 ly, east of Aludra in Canis Major and just north of the white supergiant, 3 Puppis. This object is visible to the naked eye as a faint, red-hued star with an apparent visual magnitude of 4.59. It is moving further from the Earth with a heliocentric radial velocity of +32.4 km/s.

The Hipparcos data for 1 Puppis shows low amplitude (0.007 magnitude) variability with a period of 1.8094 days. The International Variable Star Index classifies the 1 Puppis as a star with starspots that cause the brightness to change as it rotates, and which varies in visual magnitude from 4.58 to 4.63.

This is a red giant star with a stellar classification of M1 III, having exhausted the hydrogen at its core and evolved away from the main sequence. Component B is a background object. Components C and D form the binary star HD 62557 and have a similar parallax and proper motion to 1 Puppis.

References

M-type giants
Suspected variables
Puppis
Puppis, 01
CD-28 4767
062576
037648
2993